Solas (Irish: light) was an American musical group officially formed in 1996, playing Irish traditional music as well as original compositions influenced by the country, rock, and americana genres. With several members who are prominent performers, both solo and in other constellations in the irish traditional music scene, Solas has been described as a "Supergroup".

Their name comes from an Irish word meaning "light". At the time, the band was made up of Séamus Egan, who had already recorded two solo albums as well as a soundtrack to a film; Winifred Horan, a member of Cherish the Ladies; John Doyle, previously a member of Susan McKeown & The Chanting House with Egan; Karan Casey and John Williams.

In June 2008 the band announced Mairead Phelan had joined the group as their new singer.  In September 2010, Niamh Varian-Barry from Cork replaced Mairead Phelan as lead singer of Solas.  On July 11, 2013, they announced on their Facebook page that Niamh was leaving the band and that Noriana Kennedy would be replacing her. The band announced an indefinite hiatus in early 2017.

Discography
 1996 — Solas
 1997 — Sunny Spells and Scattered Showers
 1998 — The Words That Remain
 2000 — The Hour Before Dawn
 2002 — The Edge of Silence
 2003 — Another Day
 2005 — Waiting for an Echo
 2006 — Reunion: A Decade of Solas
 2008 — For Love and Laughter
 2010 — The Turning Tide
 2013 — Shamrock City
 2016 — All These Years

References

Further reading

External links 
 
 

Celtic music groups
Irish folk musical groups
Musical groups established in 1996
Irish-American culture in Philadelphia
Irish-American culture in Pennsylvania